Achaeus (Akhaios; died 213 BC) was a general and later a separatist ruler of part of the Greek Seleucid kingdom. He was the son of Andromachus, whose sister Laodice II  married Seleucus Callinicus, the father of Antiochus III the Great  He accompanied Seleucus Ceraunus, the son of Callinicus, in his expedition across mount Taurus against Attalus I, and after the assassination of Seleucus Ceraunus revenged his death; and though he might easily have assumed the royal power, he remained faithful to the family of Seleucus.

In 223 BC Antiochus III, the successor of Seleucus Ceraunus, appointed him to the command of all Asia Minor on the western side of Mount Taurus. Achaeus recovered all the districts which Attalus had gained on the Seleucids once more; but being falsely accused by Hermeias, the minister to Antiochus, of intending to revolt, Achaeus assumed the title of king in self-defence, and ruled over the whole of Asia on the western side of the Taurus. As long as Antiochus was engaged in the war with Ptolemy IV of Egypt, he could not march against Achaeus; but upon the conclusion of a treaty with Ptolemy, he crossed the Taurus, uniting his forces with Attalus, and in one campaign deprived Achaeus of his dominions and took Sardis (with the exception of the citadel). After sustaining a siege of two years, the citadel at last fell into the hands of Antiochus in 213, through the treachery of Bolis (who had been employed by Sosibius, minister to Ptolemy). Bolis pledged to deliver Achaeus to safety, but turned him over to Antiochus, who immediately put him to death.

Notes

References
 Bement, R. B.; The kingdom of Brass (1856)
 Polybius; Histories, Evelyn S. Shuckburgh (translator); London - New York, (1889)
 Smith, William (editor); Dictionary of Greek and Roman Biography and Mythology, "Achaeus (2)", Boston, (1867)

3rd-century BC births
213 BC deaths
Seleucid generals
Executed ancient Greek people
3rd-century BC executions
Ancient Greek generals